George McClellan, M.D. (1849–1913) was an American medical doctor and anatomist known for his anatomical drawings. He is the grandson of George McClellan, also a doctor.

Early life and education
George McClellan was born in Philadelphia on October 29th, 1849. He attended the University of Pennsylvania for undergraduate study, beginning in 1865; however, in 1868 he left the University of Pennsylvania during his senior year in order to begin medical school at Jefferson Medical College. During medical school, McClellan was a clinical assistant to Joseph Pancoast and Samuel D. Gross. McClellan graduated from Jefferson Medical College in 1870.

Career
After medical school, McClellan pursued a career as a general surgeon. He was appointed surgeon first at Howard Hospital, then Philadelphia General Hospital and later St. Joseph's Hospital. His was widely known for his medical work Regional Anatomy in Its Relation to Medicine and Surgery in which McClellan made his own photographs from his own dissections and completed the illustrations himself. The book went through four editions in the United States, selling over 15,000 copies.

McClellan founded the Pennsylvania School of Anatomy and Surgery where he gave lectures from 1881-1893, and taught artistic anatomy at the Pennsylvania Academy of Fine Arts for the last 23 years of his life.  His anatomical expertise was recognized by Jefferson Medical College in his 1906 appointment as chair of the applied anatomy department. George McClellan died on March 29th, 1913.

References

External links 

Regional Anatomy and its Relation to Medicine and Surgery; full text from the Jefferson Digital Commons
Regional Anatomy and its Relation to Medicine and Surgery; full text from the California Digital Library

Jefferson Medical College Yearbook from 1913

American anatomists
Jefferson Medical College faculty
1849 births
1913 deaths
McClellan family